Driton Camaj (born 7 March 1997) is a Montenegrin professional footballer of Albanian descent who plays for Hungarian club Kisvárda FC.

Club career
Camaj first played competitive football with Budućnost in Podgorica. In July 2015, Camaj went on a trial with Croatian club Inter Zaprešić at the age of 18, during which he scored in a friendly match against NK Rudeš. As a result, he signed with Inter Zaprešić. However, he only played two league matches with Inter Zaprešić, and subsequently returned to Montenegro where he spent a half season with Dečić from Tuzi. In the summer of 2016, Camaj returned to Budućnost. On January 29, 2018, Camaj signed a new three-year contract with Budućnost.

International career
Camaj played for Montenegro's U19 team in the 2016 UEFA Euro U19 Championship qualifiers, scoring a goal against Hungary in the group stage of qualification.

Camaj debuted for the Montenegro U21 in 2016. He played in a friendly match with Bosnia and Herzegovina U21 on November 10, 2016, which Bosnia won 2–0. In May 2017, Camaj was called up by Montenegro U21 coach Mojaš Radonjić for the Valeriy Lobanovskyi tournament in Ukraine. In the tournament, Camaj played against Slovenia U21 and Ukraine U21. After the tournament, Camaj played in a friendly match against Georgia U21 on June 12, 2017.

References

External links

1997 births
Living people
Footballers from Podgorica
Albanians in Montenegro
Association football forwards
Association football midfielders
Montenegrin footballers
Montenegro youth international footballers
Montenegro under-21 international footballers
FK Budućnost Podgorica players
NK Inter Zaprešić players
FK Dečić players
FK Lovćen players
FK Iskra Danilovgrad players
Kisvárda FC players
Montenegrin First League players
Croatian Football League players
Nemzeti Bajnokság I players
Montenegrin expatriate footballers
Expatriate footballers in Croatia
Expatriate footballers in Hungary
Montenegrin expatriate sportspeople in Croatia
Montenegrin expatriate sportspeople in Hungary